Jeanne E. Scott (August 17, 1948 — October 19, 2019) is a former United States district judge of the United States District Court for the Central District of Illinois.

Education and career

Scott was born in Springfield, Illinois. She received a Bachelor of Arts degree from Bradley University in 1970 and a Juris Doctor from Northwestern University School of Law in 1973. She was an Assistant state's attorney for the Sangamon County State's Attorney's Office in Illinois from 1973 to 1978. She was in private practice from 1978 to 1979 and became an associate circuit judge for the Illinois Seventh Judicial Circuit from 1979 to 1988, and a circuit judge for Illinois Seventh Judicial Circuit from 1988 to 1998.

Federal judicial service

Scott was a United States District Judge of the United States District Court for the Central District of Illinois. Scott was nominated by President Bill Clinton on April 2, 1998, to a seat vacated by Richard Henry Mills. She was confirmed by the United States Senate on October 21, 1998, and received her commission on October 22, 1998. She resigned on August 1, 2010.

Post judicial career

Since her resignation, she has been an attorney in private practice in Springfield.

References

Sources

1948 births
Living people
People from Springfield, Illinois
Bradley University alumni
Northwestern University Pritzker School of Law alumni
Illinois state court judges
Judges of the United States District Court for the Central District of Illinois
United States district court judges appointed by Bill Clinton
20th-century American judges
20th-century American women judges
21st-century American women judges
21st-century American judges
21st-century American women